The Bozed is a left tributary of the river Lechința in Romania. It flows into the Lechința in Lechincioara.

References

Rivers of Romania
Rivers of Mureș County